The following is a list of Malayalam films released in the year 1983.

Dubbed films

References

 1983
1983
Malayalam
Fil